Saint Artimidora was a Christian saint.

History 
His remains have been discovered  in the Catacomb of Callixtus in Rome.

They were transferred into the new church of Aimargues in 1979.

Bibliography 
 Cantate pour la translation des reliques de sainte Artimidora, Soustelle, 1865.
 Sainte Artimidora, ou le corps d'une sainte martyre..., Soustelle, 1865.

References

Saints from Roman Italy